Burishwar River or Paira River is a river in Barisal, Patuakhali and Barguna Districts in the southwestern part of Bangladesh. The length of the river is 90 km, the average width is 1200 metres and the nature of the river is spiral. The identification number provided by Bangladesh Water Development Board of Burieshwar-Paira river is river no. 57 in southwestern region.

References

Rivers of Bangladesh